Sybra narai is a species of beetle in the family Cerambycidae. It was described by Hayashi in 1976.

References

narai
Beetles described in 1976